K M Abdul Khaleq Chontu is a Bangladesh Nationalist Party politician and the former Member of Parliament of Kushtia-3.

Career
Chontu was elected to parliament from Kushtia-3 as a Bangladesh Nationalist Party candidate in 1991.

References

Bangladesh Nationalist Party politicians
Living people
5th Jatiya Sangsad members
Year of birth missing (living people)
Rangpur Government College alumni